Naghnaghiya (Al-Naghnaghiyya) was a Palestinian Arab village,  southeast of Haifa. It was depopulated before the outbreak of the 1948 Arab-Israeli war.

Location
The village was on the north edge of a hill at the edge of a wadi bed, overlooking the Jezreel Valley and the Nazareth hills to the north and northeast. It was the smallest of a group of three villages (known collectively as al-Ghubayyat) located together; the others were Al-Ghubayya al-Fawqa and Al-Ghubayya al-Tahta. Next to al- Naghnaghiya was an artificial mound that bore the same name. Two kilometers to the southeast, on the highway to Jenin was Tall al-Mutasallim, identified with Megiddo.

History
In 1888, during Ottoman rule, an elementary school was built that was shared by the three  al-Ghubayyat villages.

British Mandate era
In the British Mandate of Palestine period, in the 1922 census of Palestine Al Naghnaghiyeh had a population of 272; all Muslims, increasing in the  1931 census to  416, still all Muslims, in a total of  78 houses.

In the 1945 statistics the population of Al-Ghubayya al-Fawqa, Al-Ghubayya al-Tahta  and Naghnaghiya was   1,130, all  Muslims, and it had 12,139  dunams of land  according to an official land and population survey.   209  dunams were for plantations and irrigable land,  10,883  for cereals, while no data were given for built-up (urban) land.

1948, and after
Before the outbreak of the 1948 Arab-Israeli war, on the night of the 12-13 April 1948, Naghnaghiya and the neighbouring village of al-Mansi were attacked by the Palmach, a Jewish militia. By 15 April, both villages had been depopulated, and they were then blown up by the Jewish militia forces  in order to block the return of the villagers.  

According to the Palestinian historian Walid Khalidi, describing the village in 1992: "The remains of houses are scattered on the slope of one hill. The site, traversed by the Haifa-Megiddo highway and partly occupied by an Israeli soccer field, is difficult to identify."

See also
Battle of Mishmar HaEmek
Depopulated Palestinian locations in Israel

References

Bibliography

External links
Welcome to al-Naghnaghiyya
al-Naghnaghiyya, Zochrot
Survey of Western Palestine, Map 8:  IAA, Wikimedia commons 
 Al-Naghnaghiyya photos from Dr. Moslih Kanaaneh
al-Naghnaghiyya from the Khalil Sakakini Cultural Center

Arab villages depopulated prior to the 1948 Arab–Israeli War
District of Haifa